Jihad Khodr (born December 30, 1983) is a Brazilian professional surfer. He is competing on the ASP World Tour.

Khodr began his elite tour campaign in 2008. The 2009 season is his 2nd season on tour. His highest ASP World Tour rating was 44th in 2008.

As of 2009 his total career earnings are $227,650.00.

Personal life 

Jihad Khodr is a Muslim of Lebanese descent.

References

External links
 World Tour page

Brazilian surfers
1983 births
Living people
Sportspeople from Paraná (state)
Brazilian people of Lebanese descent
Brazilian Muslims
Brazilian people of Arab descent
Sportspeople of Lebanese descent